WRVZ (98.7 FM) is a Rhythmic CHR formatted broadcast radio station licensed to Pocatalico, West Virginia and serving the Charleston area.

History

WRVC Repeater 
Originally, WRVZ was launched on January 24, 1994 by WRVC in  Huntington as a broadcast relay station to expand their signal into the Charleston area when WRVC had an oldies format. WRVC was most likely motivated for doing so because the usual oldies mainstay of Charleston, WKAZ-FM, was notorious for changing formats and they saw opportunity to expand their reach even further. (They had already increased their power to 100,000 watts from Ashland at the time.)

Acquired by WVRC 
In 1997, after being acquired by  West Virginia Radio Corporation, the station asdumed a Modern AC outlet called "Planet 98.7" prior to its flip to Rhythmic Top 40 in 1998.  This is the only Rhythmic Top 40 formatted radio station in West Virginia.

External links
 WRVZ official website
 
 
 

Rhythmic contemporary radio stations in the United States
RVZ
Radio stations established in 1997